Pat Henderson (born 30 January 1943) is an Irish retired hurling manager and former player.

Born in Johnstown, County Kilkenny, Henderson first played competitive hurling during his schooling at Thurles CBS. He arrived on the inter-county scene at the age of eighteen when he first linked up with the Kilkenny minor team, before later joining the under-21 team. He made his senior debut during the 1964 championship. Henderson went on to play a key role over the next fifteen years, and one five All-Ireland medals, eight Leinster medals and two National Hurling League medals. He was an All-Ireland runner-up on five occasions.

As a member of the Leinster inter-provincial team on a number of occasions, Henderson won six Railway Cup medals. At club level he is a one-time Leinster medallist with Fenians. In addition to this he also won five championship medals.

Throughout his inter-county career, Henderson made 40 championship appearances for Kilkenny. His retirement came following the conclusion of the 1978 championship.

His brothers, Ger and John, also enjoyed All-Ireland success with Kilkenny.

In retirement from playing Henderson became involved in team management and coaching. During a near decade long tenure as Kilkenny manager he guided the team to three All-Ireland titles.

Henderson is widely regarded as one of the greatest hurlers of his era. As well as collecting back-to-back All-Stars he was named Hurler of the Year in 1974. Henderson has often been voted onto teams made up of the sport's greats, including at centre-back on the Kilkenny team of the Century.

Biography

Born in Johnstown, County Kilkenny, Henderson was the eldest son in a family that would later become synonymous with hurling in Kilkenny.  His two younger brothers, Ger and John, would form the backbone of the great Kilkenny team of the 1970s.

Henderson was educated at Johnstown national school before later receiving his secondary schooling at Thurles CBS. Here he played in the Dr. Harty Cup competition, however, Thurles CBS failed to win the provincial title during Henderson's tenure.

Playing career

Club

Henderson began his club hurling career with Johnstown before the Fenians club was formed in 1968.

After being defeated by James Stephens in the championship decider in 1969, both sides squared off against each other in the final the following year. A 2–11 to 3–5 victory gave Henderson his first championship medal.

After surrendering their championship to Bennettsbridge in the decider in 1971, Fenians returned to the final once again the following year. It was a rematch of the previous year with Henderson's side enjoying a comfortable 3–10 to 1–6 victory. This was the beginning of a great run of success. Defeats of James Stephens and Bennettsbridge in the respective finals of 1973 and 1974 brought Henderson's medal tally to four. Fenians subsequently represented Kilkenny in the provincial club series and reached the final. A narrow 2–6 to 1–6 defeat of St. Rynagh's of Offaly resulted in the Fenians becoming the first Kilkenny club to take the Leinster title.  The subsequent All-Ireland final pitted Henderson's side against the mighty St. Finbarr's of Cork.  The Barr's ability to get goals at crucial times proved to be the difference in the 3–8 to 1–6 defeat.

A fourth successive county title proved beyond Henderson's side in 1975, however, two years later Fenians were back in the championship decider.  An Eddie Keher-inspired Rower-Inistioge provided the opposition, however, Henderson won his fifth and final championship medal that day following a 3–11 to 1–10 victory.

Inter-county

Henderson first came to prominence on the inter-county scene as a member of the Kilkenny minor hurling team in 1961. It was a successful year for the young hurler as he collected a Leinster medal following a 4–12 to 0–7 trouncing of Dublin. Henderson later collected an All-Ireland Minor Hurling Championship medal following a 3–13 to 0–15 defeat of Tipperary.

In 1964 Henderson was at centre-back on Kilkenny's inaugural under-21 team, however, defeat was his lot in his sole outing in that championship.

Henderson made his senior championship debut for Kilkenny on 5 July 1964 in a 5–9 to 4–8 Leinster semi-final defeat of Wexford. He later collected his first Leinster medal as Dublin were defeated by 4–11 to 1–8 in the decider. The All-Ireland final on 6 September 1964 saw Kilkenny enter the game as firm favourites against fierce rivals Tipperary. John McKenna scored Tipp's first goal after ten minutes as the Munster champions took a 1–8 to 0–6 interval lead. The second half saw Tipperary score goals for fun, with Donie Nealon getting a hat-trick and Seán McLoughlin another. Kilkenny were humiliated at the full-time whistle as Tipperary triumphed by 5–13 to 2–8.

After surrendering their provincial crown in 1965, Kilkenny bounced back the following year by reaching the National League decider. An aggregate 10–15 to 2–15 defeat of New York gave Henderson his first National Hurling League medal. He later won a second Leinster medal following a 1–15 to 2–6 defeat of Wexford. The subsequent All-Ireland final on 4 September 1966 pitted Kilkenny against Cork for the first time in nineteen years. Kilkenny were the favourites, however, a hat-trick of goals by Colm Sheehan gave Cork a merited 3–9 to 1–10 victory.

Kilkenny retained their provincial crown in 1967, with Henderson adding a third Leinster medal to his collection following a 4–10 to 1–12 defeat of Wexford after a scare in the opening half. 3 September 1967 saw Kilkenny face Tipperary in the All-Ireland decider. Tipp looked like continuing their hoodoo over their near rivals as they took a 2–6 to 1–3 lead at half-time. Goalkeeper Ollie Walsh was the hero for Kilkenny as he made a series of spectacular saves, however, the team lost Eddie Keher and Tom Walsh to injury in the second half. In spite of this, Kilkenny laid to rest a bogey that Tipperary had over the team since 1922, and a 3–8 to 2–7 victory gave Henderson his first All-Ireland medal.

Wexford put an end to Kilkenny's hopes of retaining the title in 1968, however, the Noresiders bounced back the following year with Henderson collecting a fourth Leinster medal following a 3–9 to 0–16 defeat of Offaly. 7 September 1969 saw Kilkenny face Cork in the All-Ireland decider. The Leesiders got into their stride following an early goal by Charlie McCarthy and led by six points coming up to half time when Kilkenny raised a green flag themselves. Kilkenny upped their performance after the interval and ran out winners on a 2–15 to 2–9 scoreline. The victory gave Henderson a second All-Ireland medal.

After surrendering their provincial and All-Ireland crowns to Wexford the following year, Kilkenny began their complete dominance of the provincial championship in 1971. Henderson was appointed captain for the year, however, he missed the Leinster final victory through injury. He was back on the team for 5 September 1971 when Kilkenny faced Tipperary in the All-Ireland final, the first to be broadcast in colour by Telefís Éireann and the only eighty-minute meeting between the two sides. Kilkenny's ever-dependable goalkeeper, Ollie Walsh, had a nightmare of a game in which he conceded five goals, one of which passed through his legs, while that year's Hurler of the Year, "Babs" Keating, played out the closing stages of the game in his bare feet. Eddie Keher set a new record by scoring 2–11, however, it wasn't enough as Tipperary emerged the victors on a score line of 5–17 to 5–14.

In 1972 Henderson won a fifth Leinster medal following a thrilling draw and replay victory over Wexford. Once again, Cork provided the opposition in the All-Ireland final on 3 September 1972, a game which is often considered to be one of the classic games of the modern era. Halfway through the second-half Cork were on form and stretched their lead to eight points. Drastic action was required for Kilkenny and Eddie Keher was deployed closer to the Cork goal and finished the game with a tally of 2–9. Henderson collected his third All-Ireland medal following a remarkable 3–24 to 5–11 victory.

Henderson added a sixth Leinster medal to his collection following a 4–22 to 3–15 defeat of Wexford. Kilkenny later faced Limerick in the All-Ireland final on 2 September 1973, however, their plans were hampered as a result of injuries and emigration. In spite of this, the game hung in the balance for the first-half, however, eight minutes after the restart Mossie Dowling got a vital goal for Limerick. Shortly after this Richie Bennis spearheaded a rampant Limerick attack which resulted in a 1–21 to 1–14 victory for Limerick. In spite of this defeat Henderson later collected his first All-Star.

Wexford were, once again, narrowly defeated by Kilkenny in the 1974 provincial decider. The remarkable 6–13 to 2–24 victory gave Henderson a seventh Leinster medal. In a repeat of the previous year Limerick provided the opposition in the subsequent All-Ireland final on 1 September 1974. The Munster champions stormed to a five-point lead in the first eleven minutes, however, a converted penalty by Eddie Keher, supplemented by two further goals gave Kilkenny a 3–19 to 1–13 victory and gave Henderson a fourth All-Ireland medal. He later won a second All-Star award, as well as the Texaco Hurler of the Year award.

Kilkenny made it five successive provincial titles in-a-row in 1975. The 2–20 to 2–14 defeat of Wexford gave Henderson his eighth Leinster medal. On 7 September 1975, Henderson lined out in another All-Ireland final, with surprise semi-final winners Galway providing the opposition. Playing with the wind in the first half, Galway found themselves ahead by 0–9 to 1–3 at the interval. Eddie Keher's huge tally of 2–7 kept Galway at bay giving Kilkenny a 2–22 to 2–10 victory. It was a fifth All-Ireland medal for Henderson.

In 1976 Kilkenny looked a sure bet to capture a third successive All-Ireland crown. The season began well with Henderson winning a second National League medal following a 6–14 to 1–14 trouncing of Clare in a replay. Kilkenny's championship ambitions unravelled in spectacular fashion in the subsequent provincial campaign, when a 2–20 to 1–6 trouncing by Wexford dumped Henderson's team out of the championship.

Henderson was now in the twilight of his career as Kilkenny's fortunes took an upward turn in 1978. He missed Kilkenny's provincial victory, however, he was included on the starting fifteen that faced Cork in the subsequent All-Ireland decider on 3 September 1978. Cork secured a first three-in-a-row of All-Ireland titles for the first time in over twenty years, as a Jimmy Barry-Murphy goal helped the team to a 1–15 to 2–8 victory over Kilkenny. This defeat brought the curtain down on Henderson's inter-county career.

Inter-provincial

Henderson also lined out with the great Leinster team in the inter-provincial hurling championship.  He captured Railway Cup titles with his province in 1967, 1971, 1973, 1974, 1975 and 1977.

Managerial career

Kilkenny
In retirement from playing, Henderson turned his hand to inter-county management.  Together with Eddie Keher he guided Kilkenny to an All-Ireland victory over Galway in 1979.  Three years later in 1982 Henderson was the sole manager of his native-county.  That year he coached 'the Cats' to a National Hurling League victory, as well as an All-Ireland final victory over Cork.  In 1983 these feats were repeated with another brace of National league and All-Ireland victories.

Honours

Team

Fenians
Leinster Senior Club Hurling Championship (1): 1974
Kilkenny Senior Club Hurling Championship (5): 1970, 1972, 1973, 1974, 1978

Kilkenny
All-Ireland Senior Hurling Championship (5): 1967, 1969, 1972, 1974, 1975
Leinster Senior Hurling Championship (9): 1964, 1966, 1967, 1969, 1972, 1973, 1974, 1975, 1978 (sub)
National Hurling League (2): 1965–66, 1975–76
All-Ireland Minor Hurling Championship (1): 1961
Leinster Minor Hurling Championship (1): 1961

Leinster
Railway Cup (6): 1967, 1971, 1973, 1974 (c), 1975, 1977

Manager

Kilkenny
All-Ireland Senior Hurling Championship (3): 1979, 1982, 1983
Leinster Senior Hurling Championship (5): 1979, 1982, 1983, 1986, 1987
National Hurling League (3): 1981–82, 1982–83, 1985–86

Individual

Kilkenny Hurling Team of the Century: Centre-forward
Texaco Hurler of the Year (1): 1974
All-Stars (2): 1973, 1974
Philips Sports Manager of the Year (1): 1982

References

1943 births
Living people
Fenians hurlers
Kilkenny inter-county hurlers
Leinster inter-provincial hurlers
All-Ireland Senior Hurling Championship winners
Kilkenny hurling managers
Hurling managers